Tusi Pisi (born 18 June 1982) is a Samoan rugby union player who plays for the Toyota Industries Shuttles in the Top Challenge League. His position is fly half, but he has also played at centre and full back. He is the current first choice flyhalf for the Samoa national team.

Born in Samoa, Pisi's parents moved him and his brother George to Auckland as youngsters.

After playing for the Crusaders in  Super Rugby, he moved to Rugby Club Toulonnais in France for 2007/2008 and 2008/2009 seasons. At the end of the 2009 season in France, Pisi joined Suntory Sungoliath Rugby Club in Japan.

On 31 June 2015 Pisi represented the Barbarians FC against an England side at Twickenham Stadium.

In March 2016 Pisi signed a 2-year contract with Bristol Rugby starting from the 2016/2017 season. Pisi stayed at Bristol for 3 relatively successful seasons before joining Japanese side Toyota Industries Shuttles

References

External links
Profile on Rugby Club Toulonnais site
Hurricanes profile
 
Tusi Pisi stats v Wales 2012

1982 births
Living people
New Zealand rugby union players
Samoan rugby union players
Rugby union fly-halves
North Harbour rugby union players
Hurricanes (rugby union) players
Crusaders (rugby union) players
Tokyo Sungoliath players
RC Toulonnais players
Sunwolves players
Bristol Bears players
Sportspeople from Apia
Pacific Islanders rugby union players
People educated at Massey High School
Samoan expatriate rugby union players
Expatriate rugby union players in New Zealand
Expatriate rugby union players in France
Expatriate rugby union players in Japan
Expatriate rugby union players in England
Samoan expatriate sportspeople in New Zealand
Samoan expatriate sportspeople in France
Samoan expatriate sportspeople in Japan
Samoan expatriate sportspeople in England
New Zealand expatriate sportspeople in France
New Zealand expatriate sportspeople in Japan
New Zealand expatriate sportspeople in England
Samoa international rugby union players